Altayskoye is a rural locality (a selo) and the administrative center of Altaysky Selsoviet, Tabunsky District, Altai Krai, Russia. The population was 1,428 as of 2013. There are 15 streets.

Geography 
Altayskoye is located on the Kulundinskaya plain, 3 km north of Tabuny (the district's administrative centre) by road. Tabuny is the nearest rural locality.

References 

Rural localities in Tabunsky District